The Medal of Guarding the Frontiers is a military decoration awarded by the Central Military Commission of China,  first amended on May 4, 2010, then established on August 1, 2011. It is divided into three grades.

Criteria 
The medal is awarded to military officers, civilian cadres and soldiers who serving in remote/border and hardship areas (RBH Areas). Among them:
 A person who served 1 to 2 years in level-1 or level-2 RBH areas, or 2 to 4 years in level-3 RBH areas, or 3 to 6 years in level-4 RBH areas, or 4 to 8 years in level-5 RBH areas,  or 5 to 10 years in level-6 RBH areas is awarded with a bronze medal,
 A person who served more than 2 times the service length in the corresponding area is awarded with a silver medal,
 A person who served more than 3 times the service length in the corresponding area is awarded with a gold medal.

Service Ribbon

References 

Awards established in 2011
Military awards and decorations of the People's Liberation Army